The 24th annual Señorita México pageant, was held 1978. Thirty-two contestants competed for the national title, which was won by Alba Cervera from Yucatán who competed in Miss Universe 1978 where she was a Semifinalist. Cervera was crowned by outgoing Señorita México titleholder Felicia Mercado. She is the third Yucateca to win this title.

The Señorita Mundo México title was won by Martha Eugenia Ortiz from Distrito Federal who competed in Miss World 1978 where she was 3rd Runner-up. Ortiz was crowned by outgoing Señorita México titleholder Felicia Mercado in a previous event to final night of competition. She is the second Capitalina to win this Title.

Results

Special Awards

Expected Contestants

Señorita México

Beauty pageants in Mexico
1978 in Mexico
1978 beauty pageants